Vyacheslav Savlev is a former Soviet bobsledder who competed in the mid-1980s. He is best known for finishing runner-up in the two-man event for the 1985–86 Bobsleigh World Cup season.

References
List of two-man bobsleigh World Cup champions since 1985

Living people
Russian male bobsledders
Soviet male bobsledders
Year of birth missing (living people)
Place of birth missing (living people)
20th-century Russian people